Winning Combination is a British game show that aired on ITV from 16 November 2020 to 5 November 2021 and is hosted by Omid Djalili.

A set of 9 contestants are given a randomly allocated number and have to answer a number of general knowledge questions in battle and get the most points over others, trying to win a place in the combination. They then have a combined 30 seconds to answer the amount of general knowledge questions equal to their number.

Format 
The show starts with nine contestants, hoping to win part of a cash prize. They are randomly given a number ranging from one to nine.

First round
In the first round, they buzz in to answer a question and if they get it right, they pick two answers to another question from a board of six possible solutions/answers.

As of Series 2, Omid announces a category and reads out up to nine answers, at least two of which fit the category. Contestants can buzz in at any point and name two of the previously read answers. If both are correct, they go straight through to the Battle Round. If either is incorrect, they are locked out and all other contestants can buzz as soon as the next answer is revealed.

Battles
In the battle, each player starts out with four points and there are two minutes where players answer questions. If they get one right, they gain a point and take a point away from a fellow contestant. However, if they get it wrong, they lose a point themselves. If two or more players draw with the same amount of points when the time is up, a tie-breaker question is asked. The player with the most points gets a place in the combination, choosing to be in the thousands, hundreds, tens or units. Their place is usually decided on the value of their number, for example, the player with 9 would typically go in the thousands and the player with 1 would typically go into the units.

Final
In the Final, the four successful contestants have a combined 30 seconds to answer all of their questions. The value of their number equates to the amount of questions that they are asked. Getting a question right adds 5 seconds to the timer. If all of the questions are answered, the 'combination' get to take home a quarter of the amount of their numbers in order e.g. 9531 in the combination would be £9,531 divided 4 ways. The most that can be won is £9,876 (£2469 per player), and the least that can be won is £1,234 (£308.50 per player).

Transmissions

Regular

References

External links 
 
 

2020 British television series debuts
2021 British television series endings
2020s British game shows
English-language television shows
ITV game shows
Television series by ITV Studios